The 2022 Categoría Primera A season  (officially known as the 2022 Liga BetPlay Dimayor season for sponsorship reasons) was the 75th season of the Categoría Primera A, Colombia's top-flight football league. The season began on 20 January and ended on 7 December 2022. Deportivo Cali were the defending champions, having won the 2021 Finalización tournament.

Two tournaments (Apertura and Finalización) were played in the season, each one of them being an independent championship. In the Torneo Apertura Atlético Nacional won their seventeenth league title, beating Deportes Tolima in the finals by a 4–3 aggregate score after winning the first leg in Medellín by a 3–1 score and losing the return leg in Ibagué by two goals to one, and in the Torneo Finalización Deportivo Pereira were the champions, winning their first league title after beating Independiente Medellín on penalties following a 1–1 draw on aggregate in the finals.

Format
The competition format for this season was approved by the General Assembly of DIMAYOR on 17 December 2021:

 Two tournaments (Apertura and Finalización) with three stages each were played in the season.
 The first stage of both tournaments was contested on a single round-robin basis, with each team playing the other teams once plus an additional match against a regional rival for a total of 20 games. The top eight teams advanced to the next stage.
 In the second stage, the eight qualified teams were drawn into two groups of four teams each where they played each other team in their group twice for a total of 6 games. Both group winners advanced to the finals.
 The finals in both tournaments were contested by the winners of each semi-final group, playing a double-legged series for the championship.
 Two teams were relegated to Categoría Primera B at the end of the season. The relegation table continued considering the performance of teams over three seasons but starting from this season, the teams promoted from Primera B were not given any records from other teams, meaning that relegation would be based on averages.

Teams
20 teams took part in the season, the top 18 teams from the relegation table of the previous tournament (2021 Finalización) as well as Cortuluá and Unión Magdalena, who were promoted from the second tournament of the 2021 Primera B season. The promoted teams replaced Deportes Quindío and Atlético Huila, the bottom two teams in the relegation table of the 2021 Finalización tournament.

Stadia and locations

Managerial changes

Notes

Torneo Apertura

First stage

Standings

Results

Semi-finals
The eight teams that advanced to the semi-finals were drawn into two groups of four teams, with the top two teams from the first stage being seeded in each group. The two group winners advanced to the finals.

Group A

Group B

Finals

Atlético Nacional won 4–3 on aggregate.

Top scorers

Source: Soccerway

Torneo Finalización

First stage

Standings

Results

Semi-finals
The eight teams that advanced to the semi-finals were drawn into two groups of four teams, with the top two teams from the first stage being seeded in each group. The two group winners advanced to the finals.

Group A

Group B

Finals

Tied 1–1 on aggregate, Deportivo Pereira won on penalties.

Top scorers

Source: Soccerway

Aggregate table

Relegation
A separate table was kept to determine the teams that are relegated to the Categoría Primera B for the next season. This table was elaborated from a sum of all first stage games played in the three most recent seasons (including the 2020, 2021–I, 2021–II, 2022–I, and 2022–II tournaments), with the points earned being averaged per match played. The bottom two teams of the relegation table at the end of the season were relegated to Categoría Primera B.

Source: DimayorRules for classification: 1) average, 2) 2022 points, 3) goal difference, 4) goals scored, 5) away goals scored, 6) away goals against, 7) wins, 8) yellow cards, 9) red cards, 10) drawing of lots.

See also
 2022 Categoría Primera B season
 2022 Copa Colombia

References

External links
 Dimayor's official website 

Categoría Primera A seasons
1
Colombia